William Thomas Walsh (September 11, 1891 – January 22, 1949),  was an historian, educator and author; he was also an accomplished violinist.

Biography
Walsh was born in Waterbury, Connecticut. His educational background included a B.A. from Yale University (1913) and an honorary Litt.D. from Fordham University.  In 1914, he married Helen Gerard Sherwood, and they had six children.

Work
Walsh's work is written from an avowedly Catholic point of view. In some cases he has been accused of crossing the line between apology (for example, for the Inquisition or Isabella of Spain) and antisemitic prejudice. In the Dublin Review he wrote about the Jews that, "all their miseries, for which I could weep, are not the result, fundamentally, of the hatred and misunderstanding of others, but the consequence of their own stubborn rejection of Our Lord and Saviour Jesus Christ who predicted in unmistakable language exactly what has befallen them". In Characters of the Inquisition he wrote, "Finally, let us be realistic about the matter - there is a quality in the Jews which does not exist in any other race...is it not possible, is it not indeed obvious, that the elusive difference is spiritual?...how could such a people, cast off once more by a just God whose divine Majesty they had affronted, fail to experience an inner dislocation of the spirit, which, as the core and animating principle of their whole being, must inevitably extend disharmony, discontent, and futility to their outward acts, bodily and mental?" 

Cecil Roth accused Walsh of resurrecting the blood libel in his book Isabella of Spain. For instance, according to Roth, Walsh uncritically accepted the Spanish Inquisition's version of the La Guardia case. Walsh's reply  disputed the accusation.

Bibliography 

 The Mirage of the Many (1910)
 Isabella of Spain, the last crusader New York, R. M. McBride & company, 1930.
 Out of the Whirlwind (novel, 1935)
 Philip II (1937)
 Shekels (blank-verse play, 1937)
 Lyric Poems (1939)
 Characters of the Inquisition New York, P.J. Kennedy & Sons [c1940]
 "Gold" (short story)
 Babies, not Bullets! (booklet, 1940)
 Thirty Pieces of Silver (a play in verse)
 Saint Teresa of Ávila (1943)
 La actual situatión de España (booklet, 1944)
 El casa crucial de España (booklet, 1946)
 Our Lady of Fátima (Doubleday, 1947)  
 The Carmelites of Compiègne (a play in verse)
 Saint Peter, the Apostle (1948)

Notes

References
 New Catholic Encyclopedia, The Catholic University of America, 1967.
 Characters of the Inquisition, by William Thomas Walsh, TAN Books and Publishers, Inc, 1940/87.  
 Letters of William Thomas Walsh, kept in the archives of the Georgetown University Libraries, one of them described as "contains anti-semitic and anti-masonic references" - .

External links
 

1891 births
1949 deaths
20th-century American poets
People from Waterbury, Connecticut
Roman Catholic writers
Laetare Medal recipients
20th-century American dramatists and playwrights